Michael Johnson, known by his stage name as Twisted Insane, is an American rapper and songwriter from San Diego, California. He has released eleven studio albums. He founded the record label Brainsick Muzik, signing other rappers.

Early life 
Johnson is from San Diego, California. By the age of 12 he had begun writing rhymes, and has said that after his first live performance he was overwhelmed with emotion from the euphoric experience, and "immediately became addicted to performing live". He left home and began traveling around the United States, selling albums. When his first album, Shoot for the Face, came out in 2006, he was homeless at the time. His first mixtape came out in 2004 Brainmatter.

Rap career 
Twisted Insane raps in the Chopper style, a fast-paced style that originated in the Midwestern United States. He may have been influenced by fellow artists Bone Thugs-n-Harmony, Twista and Busta Rhymes . He grew a cult following. His first studio album, Shoot for the Face, was released in 2006 and included 21 songs, featuring Catmando, Guaran-T, West Craven, T-Nutty, Lil Face and Bleezo. His second album, The Monster in the Dark, was released in 2007, containing 18 songs, featuring Mitchy Slick, Spice 1, Uncle B, Young Bop, Marvaless, Zigg Zagg and C-Bo.

After featuring on Tech N9ne's single "Worldwide Choppers" in May 2011, alongside well-known rappers such as Busta Rhymes and Twista, he was introduced to a much wider fanbase across the world. The song remains Twisted Insane's biggest hit so far in the United States, peaking at #15 on the Billboard U.S. Heatseekers Songs chart, #30 on the R&B/Hip-Hop Digital Song Sales chart and #4 on the Bubbling Under Hot 100. Following on from this, in October 2011 he released his third album, The Root of All Evil, which was 18 tracks long and featured Chris Ray, Ric Nutt, Zigg Zagg, Marvaless, Key Loom, Bishop, C-Bo, Ise B, Ms. Karamel and T-Nutty.

June 2013 saw Twisted Insane release his fourth album, The Insane Asylum, including 20 songs, featuring Charles Xavier, Firing Squad, C Mob, Mitchy Slick, Key Loom, Redro Killson, Bishop, Bleezo, Kung Fu Vampire, Poverty's Posterboy, West Craven, Hurricane, Mr. Dos Muchos, Troll, D Loc, Crucified and Z. In July that year he was featured on the lead single of Tech N9ne's album Something Else, "So Dope (They Wanna)" alongside Wrekonize and Snow Tha Product. He was also featured in the music video for this track.

In 2014 Twisted Insane released The Last Demon, his fifth album, with 22 tracks, including collaborations with artists Rittz, JellyRoll, Charlie Ray, Khadijah Lopez, Iso, Kamikazi and Aqualeo. Voodoo, his sixth album, was released in 2015, and had 20 tracks, including guest appearances from Redro Killson, Jarren Benton, Khadijah Lopez, Dayo G, Qlayz, Tanqueray Locc, Bleezo and Charlie Ray. In 2016, he released a collaboration album with Charlie Ray, The Gatekeeper and the Keymaster, with 15 songs also featuring T Nutty. In the same year he released a solo album entitled Shoot for the Face 2, a sequel to his first album with 18 tracks, featuring Dalima, Kamikazi, Charlie Ray, Dikulz, Brotha Lynch Hung,  Blayne and rapper Lyrikal. In My Darkest Hour, released in 2017, included 19 tracks, and C-Mob, Z, Dayo G and Charlie Ray are credited as performers. His latest albums, Sickopatomous and Sick James, were released in September 2019 on Friday the 13th, featuring C. Ray, Dayo G., Lady Insane, Brodie James, Jada Lynn, Tanqueray Loc, Dikulz, Bleezo, and Z, while Sick James featured Rittz, Dayo G., Ryan Anthony, Swisher Sleep, Big June, C. Ray, Brotha Lynch Hung, Ice B, Cutty Dre, and Buk of Psychodrama.

Discography

Studio albums

Mixtapes

Compilation albums

Collaborative albums

Select guest appearances

References

External links 
 Official website

Living people
Rappers from San Diego
African-American male rappers
21st-century American rappers
21st-century American male musicians
21st-century African-American musicians
20th-century African-American people
Year of birth missing (living people)